The 1972 Trans-AMA motocross series was the third annual international series established by the American Motorcyclist Association as a pilot event to help establish motocross in the United States. The motocross series was an invitational based on a 500cc engine displacement formula, run on American tracks featuring the top riders from the F.I.M. world championship against the top American riders.

Swedish Maico factory rider Åke Jonsson dominated the championship, winning nine consecutive overall wins. 500cc world champion, Roger De Coster and Heikki Mikkola placed second and third overall, claiming one victory apiece to start off the series before Jonsson began his winning streak. Brad Lackey was the highest-placing American rider, finishing the series sixth overall.

1972 Trans-AMA final standings

1972 Trans-AMA Round 1 
Sep. 24, 1972, Copetown, Ontario

1972 Trans-AMA Round 2 
Oct. 1, 1972, Linnville, Ohio

1972 Trans-AMA Round 3 
Oct. 8, 1972, St. Peters, Missouri

1972 Trans-AMA Round 4 
Oct. 15, 1972, Atlanta, Georgia

1972 Trans-AMA Round 5 
Oct. 22, 1972, Orlando, Florida

1972 Trans-AMA Round 6 
Oct. 29, 1972, Houston Texas

1972 Trans-AMA Round 7 
Nov. 5, 1972, Carlsbad, California

1972 Trans-AMA Round 8 
Nov. 12, 1972, Phoenix, Arizona

1972 Trans-AMA Round 9 
Nov. 19, 1972, Puyallup, Washington

1972 Trans-AMA Round 10 
Nov. 26, 1972, Livermore, California

1972 Trans-AMA Round 11 
Dec. 3, 1972, Saddleback Park, California

References

See also
 1972 AMA Motocross National Championship season
 1972 FIM Motocross World Championship

Trans-AMA
Trans-AMA
Trans-AMA motocross series
AMA Motocross Championship Season
Trans-AMA